Campbell Alan Rose  (1964) is an Australian business leader with a track record of successfully building businesses across diverse industries. Recognised for his strategic and innovative approach to problem solving, he has previously led VicTrack as Chief Executive from 2013 - 2023, the Victorian state government statutory authority responsible for managing the state's railway and tram based assets. He presently leads The Anchor Group. 

Campbell is an accomplished sailor and an Australian Olympian (yachting Seoul 1988).

Education
Rose completed his HSC at Melbourne Grammar School in 1982.

In 1985, Rose received his Bachelor of Applied Science (Hons) Degree in Physical Education and Recreation from the Victoria University of Technology. In 2005, he was bestowed with an Honorary Doctorate by Victoria University for Sports Achievements in the western region of Melbourne including his services to sport, sports administration and the community.

Campbell completed the Cranlana Centre for Ethical Leadership 'The Colloquium' program in 2015.

Sporting career
In 1982 Campbell was a member of the victorious Head of the River crew for Melbourne Grammar School (5th seat), where he was also Vice Captain of the first XV Rugby team, where he played as loose head forward. He played in the Victorian School Boys Rugby Team at the International Series in New Zealand in 1980 before devoting more time to his love of yachting.

His achievements there span from 1979 to 1995 and highlights include being the Australian Representative in the Finn Dinghy Class at the inaugural Goodwill Games in Russia in 1986. He also participated as a crew member of Steak and Kidney for the America's Cup Defence Series in Perth in 1986, and as a team member (alternative helmsman) for the Australian Olympic Yachting Team at the Olympic Games in Seoul in 1988.

Business career
Capitalising on his sporting successes and combined with his entrepreneurial skills, Campbell moved to managing specific sporting events, firstly as Sports and Recreational Marketing Manager for the Victorian Health Promotion Foundation (part of the Victorian Government) in 1989 and from 1990 - 1994 as Executive Director of the Victorian Yachting Council, now Yachting Victoria. In this role he held various positions with the Australian Yachting Federation, now Yachting Australia, and the International Yacht Racing Union, now the International Sailing Federation (ISAF).

From 1994 to 1997, Campbell was Chief Executive of the Melbourne Major Events Company which was responsible for many international concerts, festivals and international sporting championships and events being brought to Melbourne and Victoria for the first time including the President's Cup, the Bledisloe Cup, Three Tenors concert, the Melbourne Fashion Festival. The success of the Melbourne Major Events Company was an integral part of repositioning Melbourne as a liveable city, and a city that is internationally recognised as a major sporting and events capital.

The procurement of these events heavily drove Victoria's economic recovery and infrastructure development, particularly around public amenity and sporting facilities.

A move to the position as Chief Executive of the Melbourne 2006 Commonwealth Games Bid, working with Ron Walker, Bid Chairman, saw the company successful in its bid for the Commonwealth Games to be held in Melbourne in 2006.

Campbell moved to Brisbane in early 1999, as Chief Executive of the 2001 Goodwill Games - The Ted Turner initiative to bring the world's best athletes together to compete in good will. This was the most successful games held from a financial perspective.

In August 2002, Campbell joined the Western Bulldogs, AFL Football Club as Chief Executive. The financial and operational problems of the Bulldogs were well documented.

After announcing a $3 Million loss within two months of arriving, Campbell set about transforming the football club into a viable, sustainable, community-oriented football club that served the needs of the whole of the western region of Melbourne.  A significant legacy of Campbell's tenure was the redevelopment/revitalisation of the Whitten Oval Whitten Oval Redevelopment (the home of the Western Bulldogs). This vision to rebuild the Whitten Oval led to the Club's revitalisation and a decade of on-field success. The Bulldogs delivered a Premiership in 2016 after a 62 year drought.

In December 2010, Campbell resigned as Chief Executive of the Western Bulldogs to take up the role at Stralliance Developments.

In 2012, Campbell was recruited to the position of Chief Executive of VicTrack commencing in February 2013. 
 
Other present and past appointments include the Melbourne Recital Centre, Victoria University Foundation, Early Childhood Management Services - a not-for-profit community childcare provider, Australia New Zealand Melanoma Trials Group, Founding Chairman of Australian Melanoma Consumer Alliance, and Founding Chairman Melbourne Melanoma Project Consumer Reference Group. Other appointments have also included: State Boating Council, Victorian Olympic Council Board, World Sailing Championship Management Board, International Sailing Federation and the Marine Board of Victoria.

In 2018, Campbell inaugurated the Prime Ministers' Sporting Oration, event provides a former Prime Minister the opportunity to deliver a speech which aims to inspire the nation through the common language of Australia: sport. The purpose of the Prime Ministers’ Sporting Oration is to raise funds for the benefit of grassroots and community sport – allocated to key cause areas nominated for that year. The inaugural oration was delivered by The Hon Julia Gillard  

In 2021, Campbell led Eloque an innovative, joint initiative between Xerox on behalf of the Palo Alto Research Centre (PARC), and the Victorian Government on behalf of VicTrack.  This was an early start up focusing on smart infrastructure assessment in the field of structural health monitoring. The Victorian Government committed $50 million to introduce the Eloque technology on priority bridges across Victoria, Australia.  Challenges at Xerox led the Victorian government to withdraw it's support and Eloque's operations were discontinued in 2022.

After 10 years of exemplary leadership at VicTrack, Campbell now leads the private advisory and consultancy firm The Anchor Group.

Honours
In 2005, he was bestowed with an Honorary Doctorate by Victoria University for Sports Achievements in the western region of Melbourne including his services to sport, sports administration and the community. and in 2006 Campbell was inducted into the Victorian University Sporting Hall of fame - Sailing .

In 2010 Campbell was made a Life Member for his services to the Western Bulldogs Football Club.

In 2017 Campbell was made a Member of the Order of Australia (AM) "For significant service to sports administration, to infrastructure and transport development, and to the community of Victoria".

Personal
Campbell has 4 children.
Campbell has 3 older sisters and a younger brother.

Victoria University Success Story
The Brisbane Institute biography of Campbell Rose

Olympic sailors of Australia
Australian male sailors (sport)
Western Bulldogs administrators
1964 births
Living people
Australian chief executives
Victoria University, Melbourne alumni
Members of the Order of Australia
People educated at Melbourne Grammar School